Thumbapoo is an Indian Malayalam-language soap opera written by Sharmila V Sharmi and scriped by Sangeetha Mohan. The show premiered on 18 October 2021 on Mazhavil Manorama. It stars Mridula Vijay, Niyuktha Prasad and Sachin SG in lead roles along with Remya Sudha, Julie Hendry and Amritha in pivotal roles. All episodes of this show is streaming on Manorama Max.

Cast

Lead roles
 Mridula Vijay / Niyuktha Prasad as Adv. Veena Ramakrishnan.
 Megha Mahesh as Young Veena
 Sachin SG as Rameshan. Childhood friend and husband of Veena.

Pivotal roles
 Remya Sudha as Soudamini. Wife of Ramakrishnan. Mother of Veena and Vidya.
 Julie Hendry as Vidya. Younger sister of Veena.
 Amritha
Rini Raj as Sanjana 
 Ambili Devi as Maya
 Rudra Prathap as Adv. Sivasankaran
 Kunchan as Ramakrishnan. Father of Veena and Vidya.
 VK Baiju as Sreekumar. Husband of Renuka.
 Sangeetha Rajendran as Rema, the eldest sister of Rameshan.
 Keerthi Krishna as Renuka. One of the two elder sisters of Rameshan.
 Nayana Josan as Reena, Rameshans and, Maya's Daughter
 Kiran Dev as Johnny, an employee at KSEB. Close friend of Rameshan.
 Ramya Salim
 Amith as Soman Kartha. Owner of Alpha Builders. Husband of Geetha. Father of Jishnu (born to his wife Geetha) and Swathi (born to his former lover Sugandhi). Former lover of Sugandhi.
 Deepa Jayan as Malu
 Reshma R Nair as Neenu.
 Rajesh Hebbar as the owner of Corba Gelatin.
 Abees Raj as Adv. Mannadiar

Cameo appearances
 Rimi Tomy as Herself
Yuva Krishna as Manu (in Promotional video)

Production
Lead actress Mridula Vijay withdrew from the show due to pregnancy.

References

Malayalam-language television shows
Mazhavil Manorama original programming